"Qué Maldición" is a song recorded by Mexican Banda Banda MS and American rapper Snoop Dogg. It was released by Lizos Music on May 1, 2020. A remix version with Becky G was released on December 10, 2020.

Charts

Certifications

Release history

References

2020 singles
2020 songs
Snoop Dogg songs
Becky G songs
Songs written by Becky G